The slash rating, under the United States National Electrical Code, is given to circuit interrupt hardware and specifies a maximum line-to-ground voltage rating in combination with a maximum line-to-line voltage rating.  One common application would be for a three-phase electrical loads.  For example a 120/240 V rating can disqualify a circuit breaker for use with a delta system load that would otherwise work with a wye system load.

References
 Code Basics: Electrical Construction & Maintenance, Feb 1, 2004, by Mike Holt, NEC Consultant;
 Overcurrent Protection and the NEC

Electrical safety